The Ogden–Roxburgh model is an approach which extends hyperelastic material models to allow for the Mullins effect. It is used in several commercial finite element codes, and is named for R.W. Ogden and D. G. Roxburgh.

The basis of pseudo-elastic material models is a hyperelastic second Piola–Kirchhoff stress , which is derived from a suitable strain energy density function :

The key idea of pseudo-elastic material models is that the stress during the first loading process is equal to the basic stress . Upon unloading and reloading  is multiplied by a positive softening function . The function  thereby depends on the strain energy  of the current load and its maximum  in the history of the material:

It was shown that this idea can also be used to extend arbitrary inelastic material models for softening effects.

References 

L. Mullins, Rubber Chemistry and Technology, 42, 339 (1969).

Continuum mechanics
Elasticity (physics)
Rubber properties
Solid mechanics